Piers O'Conor (born 28 August 1995) is an English rugby union fullback for Bristol Bears in Premiership Rugby. O'Conor has previously played for Wasps, Bedford and Ealing Trailfinders. He has played for Ireland at under-19s level and England at under-20s level.

Career
O'Conor took up rugby at Cumnor House School aged 7. He played for several clubs in Sussex, including winning the national U-17s Bowl with Heathfield and Waldron in 2012, before joining Eastbourne College where he was coached by Russell Earnshaw.

O'Conor played for Ireland under-19s in 2013 before signing for Wasps.  He made his Wasps debut in November 2014 in the LV Cup against Sale.  O'Conor left Wasps in 2017 to join Ealing Trailfinders in the RFU Championship. After one season at Ealing O'Conor moved on to newly promoted Bristol Bears in Premiership Rugby.

References

1995 births
Living people
Bedford Blues players
Bristol Bears players
English rugby union players
Rugby union fullbacks
Wasps RFC players